The Prophet, the Gold and the Transylvanians is a 1978 Romanian film directed by Romanian director Dan Pița. It is the first in a Red Western trilogy that also comprises The Artiste, the Dollars and the Transylvanians and The Oil, the Baby and the Transylvanians. The film's dialogue is in English and Romanian.

Plot
The mining town of Cedar City, Utah, is ruled by Mr. Walthrope, a polygamous Mormon prophet (Victor Rebengiuc), his son the marshall (Gheorghe Visu) and their band of ruffians. John Brad (Ovidiu Iuliu Moldovan) is falsely accused of shooting a gunfighter sent against him by the prophet in the back and has to flee. Meanwhile, a train brings Jeff Groghan, a gunfighter called by Walthrope, and two Transylvanian immigrants, Traian (Ilarion Ciobanu) and Romulus Brad (Mircea Diaconu), who come to meet their brother John. Traian speaks only Romanian and Romulus tries to get by with his dictionary.

On the station, Grogham is received with a gunfight and Traian has occasion to fire his Turkish gun, booty from the siege of Plevna. Upon arrival to the saloon, Traian is invited to play poker with Groghan, a former Confederate officer still in grey uniform and another man. Traian manages to win many dollars and Bob (Ahmed Gabbany), the slave of the Confederate officer.

The fun is interrupted by the arrival of the prophet. With very limited command of English, the Brads tell him that they are looking for John, whose face they see on wanted posters. They are judged by the innocuous drunkard Dolittle who sentences them to hanging but the prophet takes them to his farm, where they toil as farm hands.

The Brads and Bob escape and live in a hut under the Romanian flag where they fish and find gold nuggets. John tries to organize the miners against the prophet who sets the prices and takes their gold away to Salt Lake City, but the miners prefer to let things stay as they are.

Later, Walthrope's men assault one man and his daughter that is rescued by John Brad. John and the girl finally reach the Brads' hut. They team together to stop the party that carries the miners' gold stolen by the Mormons.

In the ensuing gunfight, the Brads win and successfully defend the miners' camp against the whole Walthrope band. Walthrope is captured and the Brads, Bob and the girl ride into the sunset.

Cast
Ilarion Ciobanu – Traian Brad
Ovidiu Iuliu Moldovan – Johnny Brad
Mircea Diaconu – Romulus Brad
Victor Rebengiuc – Ezekiel Waltrope (The Prophet)
 – Judge Dolittle
Gheorghe Visu – Marshall Joshua Waltrope
 – Colonel J. Anderson		
 – Sarah Waltrope
 – (a Lady in the train)
– Jeff Groghan
 – June Ambler

External links

The Prophet, the Gold and the Transylvanians at CineMagia
List of Romanian films

1978 films
1970s Western (genre) comedy films
1970s Romanian-language films
1970s English-language films
English-language Romanian films
Polygamy in fiction
The Transylvanians series
Films directed by Dan Pița
Films about Mormonism
Iron County, Utah
Films set in Utah
Films about prophets
1978 comedy films
Mormonism in fiction
1978 multilingual films
Romanian multilingual films
Foreign films set in the United States